Ascodesmis is a genus of fungi in the family Ascodesmidaceae. It was described by French botanist Philippe Édouard Léon Van Tieghem in 1876. Species in the genus are coprophilous, and are characterized by the absence of an exipulum (tissues containing the hymenium of a fruit body).

Species
Ascodesmis aurea
Ascodesmis echinulata
Ascodesmis macrospora
Ascodesmis microscopica
Ascodesmis nana
Ascodesmis nigricans
Ascodesmis obristii
Ascodesmis porcina
Ascodesmis reticulata
Ascodesmis sphaerospora
Ascodesmis volutelloides

References

Pezizales
Pezizales genera